The Jim Rudd Unit a.k.a. the Jim Rudd Transfer Facility is a state prison for men located in Brownfield, Terry County, Texas, owned and operated by the Texas Department of Criminal Justice.  This facility was opened in March 1995, and a maximum capacity of 612 male inmates held at various security levels.

The prison was named for Texas political figure Jim Rudd.

References

Prisons in Texas
Terry County, Texas
1995 establishments in Texas